Aganocrossus urostigma, is a species of dung beetle found with a widespread distribution from Southern Afghanistan, Pakistan, India, Sri Lanka, Nepal, Bhutan, China; Taiwan, Korean Peninsula, Japan, towards Vietnam, Laos, Cambodia, Thailand, Malaysia: Malacca and Borneo; Indonesia, Philippines, and Russia.

Adult beetles are active from early June to late September. They are commonly observed from the droppings of horses and cows and sometimes from human excreta. Ecological niches include both deciduous forests and light forests yachts as well as open spaces.

This species was formerly a member of the genus Aphodius.

References

Scarabaeidae
Insects of Sri Lanka
Insects described in 1862